This is a list of Bulgarian football transfers for the 2008-09 season. Only moves from and/or to the Bulgarian "A" professional football group are listed.

Summer transfer window

May

June

July

August

September

October

Winter transfer window

December

January

Bulgaria
Tran
2008-09
Bulgaria